ISO/IEC JTC 1/SC 27 Information security, cybersecurity and privacy protection is a standardization subcommittee of the Joint Technical Committee ISO/IEC JTC 1 of the International Organization for Standardization (ISO) and the International Electrotechnical Commission (IEC). ISO/IEC JTC 1/SC 27 develops International Standards, Technical Reports, and Technical Specifications within the field of information security. Standardization activity by this subcommittee includes general methods, management system requirements, techniques and guidelines to address information security, cybersecurity and privacy. Drafts of International Standards by ISO/IEC JTC 1 or any of its subcommittees are sent out to participating national standardization bodies for ballot, comments and contributions. Publication as an ISO/IEC International Standard requires approval by a minimum of 75% of the national bodies casting a vote. The international secretariat of ISO/IEC JTC 1/SC 27 is the Deutsches Institut für Normung (DIN) located in Germany.

History
ISO/IEC JTC 1/SC 27 was founded by ISO/IEC JTC 1 in 1990. The subcommittee was formed when ISO/IEC JTC 1/SC 20, which covered standardization within the field of security techniques, covering "secret-key techniques" (ISO/IEC JTC 1/SC 20/WG 1), "public-key techniques" (ISO/IEC JTC 1/SC 20/WG 2), and "data encryption protocols" (ISO/IEC JTC 1/SC 20/WG 3) was disbanded. This allowed for ISO/IEC JTC 1/SC 27 to take over the work of ISO/IEC JTC 1/SC 20 (specifically that of its first two working groups) as well as to extend its scope to other areas within the field of IT security techniques. Since 1990, the subcommittee has extended or altered its scope and working groups to meet the current standardization demands. ISO/IEC JTC 1/SC 27, which started with three working groups, eventually expanded its structure to contain five. The two new working groups were added in April 2006, at the 17th Plenary Meeting in Madrid, Spain.

Scope
The scope of ISO/IEC JTC 1/SC 27 is "The development of standards for the protection of information and ICT. This includes generic methods, techniques and guidelines to address both security and privacy aspects, such as:
 Security requirements capture methodology; 
 Management of information and ICT security; in particular information security management systems, security processes, security controls and services; 
 Cryptographic and other security mechanisms, including but not limited to mechanisms for protecting the accountability, availability, integrity and confidentiality of information; 
 Security management support documentation including terminology, guidelines as well as procedures for the registration of security components; 
 Security aspects of identity management, biometrics and privacy;  
 Conformance assessment, accreditation and auditing requirements in the area of information security management systems; 
 Security evaluation criteria and methodology.
SC 27 engages in active liaison and collaboration with appropriate bodies to ensure the proper development and application of SC 27 standards and technical reports in relevant areas."

Structure
ISO/IEC JTC 1/SC 27 is made up of five working groups (WG), each of which is responsible for the technical development of information and IT security standards within the programme of work of ISO/IEC JTC 1/SC 27. In addition, ISO/IEC JTC 1/SC 27 has two special working groups (SWG): (i) SWG-M, which operates under the direction of ISO/IEC JTC 1/SC 27 with the primary task of reviewing and evaluating the organizational effectiveness of ISO/IEC JTC 1/SC 27 processes and mode of operations; and (ii) SWG-T, which operates under the direction of ISO/IEC JTC 1/SC 27 to address topics beyond the scope of the respective existing WGs or that can affect directly or indirectly multiple WGs. ISO/IEC JTC 1/SC 27 also has a Communications Officer whose role is to promote the work of ISO/IEC JTC 1/SC 27 through different channels: press releases and articles, conferences and workshops, interactive ISO chat forums and other media channels. 

The focus of each working group is described in the group's terms of reference. Working groups of ISO/IEC JTC 1/SC 27 are:

Collaborations
ISO/IEC JTC 1/SC 27 works in close collaboration with a number of other organizations or subcommittees, both internal and external to ISO or IEC, in order to avoid conflicting or duplicative work. Organizations internal to ISO or IEC that collaborate with or are in liaison to ISO/IEC JTC 1/SC 27 include:
 ISO/IEC JTC 1/SWG 6, Management
 ISO/IEC JTC 1/WG 7, Sensor networks
 ISO/IEC JTC 1/WG 9, Big Data
 ISO/IEC JTC 1/WG 10, Internet of Things (IoT)
 ISO/IEC JTC 1/SC 6, Telecommunications and information exchange between systems
 ISO/IEC JTC 1/SC 7, Software and systems engineering
 ISO/IEC JTC 1/SC 17, Cards and personal identification
 ISO/IEC JTC 1/SC 22, Programming languages, their environments and system software interfaces
 ISO/IEC JTC 1/SC 25, Interconnection of information technology equipment
 ISO/IEC JTC 1/SC 31, Automatic identification and data capture techniques
 ISO/IEC JTC 1/SC 36, Information technology for learning, education and training
 ISO/IEC JTC 1/SC 37, 	Biometrics
 ISO/IEC JTC 1/SC 38, Cloud computing and distributed platforms
 ISO/IEC JTC 1/SC 40, IT Service Management and IT Governance
 ISO/TC 8, Ships and marine technology
 ISO/TC 46, Information and documentation
 ISO/TC 46/SC 11, Archives/records management
 ISO/TC 68, Financial services
 ISO/TC 68/SC 2, Financial Services, security
 ISO/TC 68/SC 7, Core banking
 ISO/TC 171, Document management applications
 ISO/TC 176, Quality management and quality assurance
 ISO/TC 176/SC 3, Supporting technologies
 ISO/TC 204, Intelligent transport systems
 ISO/TC 215, Health informatics
 ISO/TC 251, Asset management
 ISO/TC 259, Outsourcing
 ISO/TC 262, Risk management
 ISO/TC 272, Forensic sciences
 ISO/TC 292, Security and resilience
 ISO/CASCO, Committee on Conformity Assessments
 ISO/TMB/JTCG, Joint technical Coordination Group on MSS
 ISO/TMB/SAG EE 1, Strategic Advisory Group on Energy Efficiency
 IEC/SC 45A, Instrumentation, control and electrical systems of nuclear facilities
 IEC/TC 57, Power systems management and associated information exchange
 IEC/TC 65, Industrial-process measurement, control and automation
 IEC Advisory Committee on Information security and data privacy (ACSEC)

Some organizations external to ISO or IEC that collaborate with or are in liaison to ISO/IEC JTC 1/SC 27 include:
 Attribute-based Credentials for Trust (ABC4Trust)
 Article 29 Data Protection Working Party
 Common Criteria Development Board (CCDB)
 Consortium of Digital Forensic Specialists (CDFS)
 CEN/TC 377
 CEN/PC 428 e-Competence and ICT professionalism
 Cloud Security Alliance (CSA)
 Cloud Standards Customer Council (CSCC)
 Common Study Center of Telediffusion and Telecommunication (CCETT)
 The Cyber Security Naming & Information Structure Groups (Cyber Security)
 Ecma International
 European Committee for Banking Standards (ECBS)
 European Network and Information Security Agency (ENISA)
 European Payments Council (EPC)
 European Telecommunications Standards Institute (ETSI)
 European Data Centre Association (EUDCA)
 Eurocloud
 Future of Identity in the Information Society (FIDIS)
 Forum of Incident Response and Security Teams (FIRST)
 Information Security Forum (ISF)
 Latinoamerican Institute for Quality Assurance (INLAC)
 Institute of Electrical and Electronics Engineers (IEEE)
 International Conference of Data Protection and Privacy Commissioners
 International Information Systems Security Certification Consortium ((ISC)2)
 International Smart Card Certification Initiatives (ISCI)
 The International Society of Automation (ISA)
 INTERPOL
 ISACA
 International Standardized Commercial Identifier (ISCI)
 Information Security Forum (ISF)
 ITU-T
 Kantara Initiative
 MasterCard
 PReparing Industry to Privacy-by-design by supporting its Application in REsearch (PRIPARE)
 Technology-supported Risk Estimation by Predictive Assessment of Socio-technical Security (TREsPASS)
 Privacy and Identity Management for Community Services (PICOS)
 Privacy-Preserving Computation in the Cloud (PRACTICE)
 The Open Group
 The OpenID Foundation (OIDF)
 TeleManagement Forum (TMForum)
 Trusted Computing Group (TCG)
 Visa

Member countries
Countries pay a fee to ISO to be members of subcommittees.

The 51 "P" (participating) members of ISO/IEC JTC 1/SC 27 are: Algeria, Argentina, Australia, Austria, Belgium, Brazil, Canada, Chile, China, Cyprus, Czech Republic, Côte d'Ivoire, Denmark, Finland, France, Germany, India, Ireland, Israel, Italy, Jamaica, Japan, Kazakhstan, Kenya, Republic of Korea, Luxembourg, Malaysia, Mauritius, Mexico, Netherlands, New Zealand, Norway, Peru, Poland, Romania, Russian Federation, Rwanda, Singapore, Slovakia, South Africa, Spain, Sri Lanka, Sweden, Switzerland, Thailand, the Republic of Macedonia, Ukraine, United Arab Emirates, United Kingdom, United States of America, and Uruguay.

The 20 "O" (observing) members of ISO/IEC JTC 1/SC 27 are: Belarus, Bosnia and Herzegovina, Costa Rica, El Salvador, Estonia, Ghana, Hong Kong, Hungary, Iceland, Indonesia, Islamic Republic of Iran, Lithuania, Morocco, State of Palestine, Portugal, Saudi Arabia, Serbia, Slovenia, Swaziland, and Turkey.

As of August 2014, the spread of meeting locations since Spring 1990 has been as shown below:

Published standards
ISO/IEC JTC 1/SC 27 currently has 147 published standards within the field of IT security techniques, including:

See also
 ISO/IEC JTC 1
 List of ISO standards
 Deutsches Institut für Normung
 International Organization for Standardization
 International Electrotechnical Commission

References

External links 
 ISO/IEC JTC 1/SC 27 home page
 ISO/IEC JTC 1/SC 27 page at ISO
 ISO/IEC Joint Technical Committee 1 - Information Technology (public website)
 ISO/IEC Joint Technical Committee 1 (Livelink password-protected available documents)
 ISO/IEC Joint Technical Committee 1 (freely available documents), JTC 1 Supplement, Standing Documents and Templates
 ISO and IEC procedural documentation
 ISO DB Patents (including JTC 1 patents)
 ITU-T Study Group 17 (SG17)
 ISO International Organization for Standardization
 IEC International Electrotechnical Commission
 Access to ISO/IEC JTC 1/SC 27 Freely Available Standards

027
Identity management initiative
Information assurance standards